The Sportsmaster is the name of different supervillains appearing in American comic books published by DC Comics. The Lawrence "Crusher" Crock version of Sportsmaster is usually depicted as a criminal who uses sports-themed weapons and gadgets to commit crimes. He is also the husband of Paula Brooks and the father of Artemis Crock.

Crusher / Sportsmaster appeared in Young Justice, voiced by Nick Chinlund, and Stargirl, portrayed by Neil Hopkins.

Publication history
The Lawrence Crock version of Sportsmaster first appeared in All-American Comics #85 (May 1947) and was created by writer John Broome and artist Irwin Hasen.

The Victor Gover version of Sportsmaster first appeared in Manhunter #17 and was created by John Ostrander, Doug Rice, and Kim Yale.

Fictional character biography

Lawrence "Crusher" Crock

Earth-Two version
He was the foe of the original Green Lantern as well as Wildcat. He was first known as Crusher Crock, a frustrated athlete who turns to a life of crime. He was a member of different incarnations of the Injustice Society. He helped capture the JSA using an exploding ball, after which they were hypnotized and then during the Patriotic Crimes he steals Old Ironside. He teams up with (and later marries) the Golden Age villainess Huntress. Later they have a child named Artemis Crock who became the third Tigress. In his later years he spent time behind bars but at least on one occasion was broken out of prison by his daughter - then a member of Injustice Unlimited. Following his death, his body was cloned by a secret organization called the Council for their enforcers (they had previously used Manhunter).

In the Elseworlds miniseries The Golden Age, set outside regular DC Comics continuity, Sportsmaster's real name was revealed to be Lawrence Crock. He first appears in issue #2, robbing a jewelry store in the same building as the GBS radio station. He battles Alan Scott in a physical fight. According to the mini-series, he had a daughter he could not see and was hoping to earn enough money committing robberies to win her back. Later he joins the forces of Tex Thompson (secretly Ultra-Humanite in Thompson's body). He dies trying to save a little girl from being killed by Dynaman. His death convinces Alan Scott to join the fight.

Earth-One version
The Earth-One version of the character (see DC Comics Multiverse) had the same name and origin, but was the foe of Robin and Batgirl. He also married his universe's version of the Huntress. After losing a villains versus heroes baseball game, they reformed and have not been seen since. Since the Crisis on Infinite Earths, this version was apparently wiped from existence or merged with his Earth-2 counterpart.

The New 52
In 2011, The New 52 rebooted the DC universe. The Lawrence Crock version of Sportsmaster appears as a member of Leviathan. He is also mentioned to be the roommate of Clock King, and the two fight Harley Quinn.

Victor Gover

Pre-Zero Hour
There was also another Sportsmaster whose identity was Victor Gover, an African-American former football player who possessed "photographic reflexes". Blacklisted from the world of professional sports after his meta-human abilities were revealed, he turned to crime with a special armored suit that he wore. He fought against Manhunter.

Suicide Squad
He also became a member of the Suicide Squad for one mission during War of the Gods. They are sent on an intelligence-gathering mission against the magic-user Circe. The Sportsmaster's allies included Black Adam, Javelin, and the author avatar of Grant Morrison. Sportsmaster was one of the few members to survive this mission.

Post-Zero Hour
Following the events of Zero Hour, the character of Victor Gover was radically altered. Victor Gover was now a white male with blonde hair, who no longer had photographic reflex powers, but was a disgraced all-American athlete who turned to crime due to an addiction to gambling. Furthermore, he also wore an exact replica of the original Sportsmaster's costume. Fighting Wildcat, Victor was betting on himself as part of a betting parlor based on metahuman fights. Gover then fought against a handicapped JSA, who were taking a dive to ensure the kidnapped Ma Hunkel's safety. After Wildcat freed Ma Hunkel, the JSA quickly routed him. Wildcat then took Gover to the alley where the whole incident began, beat Gover savagely, and forced Gover to retire as a supervillain and attend Gamblers Anonymous.

Sportsmen
There were two individuals who modeled their modus operandi after the original Sportsmaster, the Sportsman of Earth-2 and the Sportsman of Earth-1.

The Earth-2 version gained his powers from absorption of an anti-proton globe which enhanced his physical attributes and allowed him to wield seemingly telekinetic control of various sports related implements. This version embarked on a life of crime as a result of the globe's effect on the rational functions of his cerebral cortex. He battled several heroes including the Golden Age Robin and Wildcat.

The Earth-1 version was Martin Mantle, Jr. and appeared only in Batman #338 (1981). During Mantle's youth, his father, disgusted by his son's poor athletic performance, forcibly subjected him to unsafe enhancement treatment in a twisted attempt to make him more "manly". Although emotionally scarred by the incident, Mantle indeed grew up to become a champion athlete, only to learn his father's procedure was altering his body in a way that would eventually kill him. As the Sportsman, he embarked on a brief life of crime with Olympian-level physical attributes and specialized equipment of his own design. His adversary was the Silver Age Batman who allowed him to "win" once he became aware that Mantle's life was nearing its end.

Final Crisis Aftermath
Sportsmaster appears as one of General Immortus' followers in Final Crisis Aftermath: Run!. His real name, origin, and any connection to Crock is not revealed. He is killed in an explosion. His look is modeled on the Earth-One Sportsman.

Powers and abilities
Crock uses sporting-themed weapons such as exploding baseballs, flying bases, rocket baseball bats, knockout basketballs, lacrosse snare nets, exploding hockey pucks. Their outfits generally included a baseball cap, catcher's mask, padded jersey, catcher's chestguard, football-style pants, and cleats.

Each of the Sportsmasters and Sportsmen had superb physical attributes on par with Olympic athletes in their prime. As noted above, Victor Gover also had "photographic reflexes".

Other versions

Flashpoint
In the alternate timeline of the Flashpoint event, Sportsmaster is imprisoned in Doom prison. During the prison break, Sportsmaster was forced by Heat Wave and Eel O'Brian attempt to breakout from cells. Sportsmaster's heart is torn out by Eel O'Brian.

In other media

Television
 A character based on Sportsmaster named Sportsman appears in the Justice League episode "Legends", voiced by Michael McKean.
 Sportsmaster makes non-speaking cameo appearances in Justice League Unlimited. Following a minor appearance in the episode "The Cat and the Canary" as a participant in Roulette's "Meta-Brawl", he appears as a member of Gorilla Grodd's Secret Society as of the episode "The Great Brain Robbery".
 Sportsmaster appears in Batman: The Brave and the Bold, voiced by Thomas F. Wilson.
 The Lawrence "Crusher" Crock incarnation of Sportsmaster appears in Young Justice, voiced by Nick Chinlund. This version is the ex-husband of the Huntress, with whom he has two daughters, Artemis Crock and Cheshire. A former member of Ra's al Ghul's League of Shadows, he becomes the top assassin and enforcer of Project Cadmus' Board of Directors, "The Light". In season one, Sportsmaster uses his relationship to Artemis to blackmail her into joining the Light, only for her to betray and capture him. Having escaped sometime before the second season, he vows vengeance on Black Manta for Artemis' apparent murder at the hands of Manta's son, Kaldur'ahm, but lays his vendetta to rest when he discovers that Artemis faked her death to infiltrate the Light.
 The Lawrence "Crusher" Crock incarnation of Sportsmaster appears in Stargirl, portrayed by Neil Hopkins. This version is a member of the Injustice Society of America (ISA). In the pilot episode, Sportsmaster partook in the ISA's attack on the Justice Society of America (JSA)'s headquarters. In the two-part episode "Stars and S.T.R.I.P.E.", Sportsmaster assists the ISA in enacting Project: New America, only to be foiled and defeated by Stargirl's JSA. In the episode "Summer School: Chapter Thirteen", Artemis Crock breaks Sportsmaster and Tigress out of prison so that they can help Cindy Burman and the JSA fight Eclipso. Following this, the Crock family move in next door to the Whitmore-Dugan family at the end of season two. In season three, Sportsmaster and Tigress work with the JSA to investigate Gambler's death and find the person responsible for spying on Blue Valley's citizens until they are killed by Icicle.

Film
During pre-production, James Gunn originally considered adding Sportsmaster to the titular team of his film The Suicide Squad, but eventually decided not to use the character.

Video games
The Young Justice incarnation of Sportsmaster appears as a boss in Young Justice: Legacy, voiced again by Nick Chinlund.

References

Fictional players of American football
Fictional mercenaries in comics
Fictional male sportspeople
Comics characters introduced in 1989
Characters created by John Ostrander
Earth-Two
DC Comics supervillains
DC Comics male supervillains
Golden Age supervillains
Comics characters introduced in 1947
Characters created by John Broome